The 2019 NASCAR Xfinity Series was the 38th season of the NASCAR Xfinity Series, a stock car racing series sanctioned by NASCAR in the United States.

Tyler Reddick entered as the defending champion, and won his second championship over Cole Custer and Christopher Bell, who were known as "the big three" over the course of the season as they dominated the vast majority of the races. Reddick also clinched the 2019 Regular Series Championship following the 2019 Rhino Pro Truck Outfitters 300 at Las Vegas Motor Speedway. Reddick became the first back-to-back champion to drive for two different teams (JR Motorsports in 2018 and Richard Childress Racing in 2019).

The season marked the debut of the Toyota Supra, which replaced the Camry.

Teams and drivers

Complete schedule

Limited schedule

Notes

Changes

Teams
On September 21, 2018, Brandonbilt Motorsports announced they would run the No. 86 car full-time for three part-time drivers. The only one announced at the time was Brandon Brown.
On October 15, 2018, it was announced that longtime sponsor Lilly Diabetes will be pulling out of NASCAR, leaving the Roush Fenway Racing No. 16 car unsponsored for 2019. On December 2, 2018, Ty Majeski said that RFR will not have an Xfinity program in 2019.
On November 17, 2018, Stewart-Haas Racing announced that they would run a second full time car in 2019. On November 27, 2018, Chase Briscoe was announced as the driver of the No. 98 Ford.
On December 21, 2018, Rick Ware Racing announced that they will field the No. 25 car full-time in 2019, beginning at Daytona in February. However, they showed up to Daytona with No. 17 and used that number instead.
On January 4, 2019, Chip Ganassi Racing suspended operations in the Xfinity Series due to a lack of sponsorship. The shutdown was announced after the home of the CEO of DC Solar, the team's primary sponsor, was raided by the FBI on December 18, 2018.
On January 10, 2019, B. J. McLeod Motorsports announced they will field the Nos. 5, 78, and 99 full-time in 2019.
On January 25, 2019, JR Motorsports announced that for the 2019 season, Michael Annett would transfer from the No. 5 to the No. 1 while Noah Gragson would drive the No. 9 car full-time and the No. 8 car would be driven by Zane Smith, Brett Moffitt, Ryan Preece, Ryan Truex, Jeb Burton, Chase Elliott, Dale Earnhardt Jr., Sheldon Creed and Regan Smith.
On February 14, 2019, Xtreme Concepts Inc. announced that it has formed XCI Racing and will field the No. 81 Toyota at Chicagoland, Daytona, Bristol, and Darlington. The team has a technical alliance with Joe Gibbs Racing.
In March 2019, it was confirmed that RSS Racing switched from Pro Motor Engines to Richard Childress Racing for their Chevrolet-based engines and chassis at the beginning of the season.
On May 23, 2019, Matt Hurley created H2 Motorsports, fielding the No. 28 Toyota starting at Iowa in June for Shane Lee, with the intention of running the remainder of the Xfinity schedule. The team ended up skipping the three road course races of Watkins Glen, Mid-Ohio, and Road America and then again at Darlington, but ran the remainder of the schedule. Lee was later released as driver and the team withdrew before the race at Darlington.
On May 30, 2019, it was reported that Hattori Racing Enterprises will field the No. 61 Toyota at the July Daytona race, marking the team's first Xfinity race since 2015. but failed to qualify.
On August 23, 2019, it was announced that Preston Pardus, the son of former NASCAR driver Dan Pardus, would make his series debut at Road America with his own team, which was formed after purchasing a road course car from the closed Chip Ganassi Racing No. 42 team. Jayski.com also says the team plans to run at the Charlotte Roval in September.

Drivers
On August 15, 2018, Elliott Sadler announced his retirement from full-time competition, thus leaving the JR Motorsports No. 1 team open. It was announced on September 25 that Noah Gragson would replace Sadler, driving the No. 1 Chevrolet Camaro SS full time in 2019. On January 25, 2019, it was announced that Gragson would be driving the No. 9 car full-time in 2019.
On September 22, 2018, B. J. McLeod Motorsports announced that Vinnie Miller would run the No. 78 with them full-time in 2019, and also run the final six races of the 2018 season with the team after securing his release from JD Motorsports.
On October 15, 2018, Ryan Reed announced that, due to his sponsor Lilly Diabetes leaving the team, he would not return to the No. 16 Roush Fenway Racing Ford Mustang GT in 2019, leaving him a free agent.
On October 19, 2018, Spencer Gallagher announced that he would be retiring from racing at the end of the 2018 season and would take on a managerial role at GMS Racing. On December 6, 2018, it was announced that John Hunter Nemechek would replace Gallagher in the No. 23 Chevrolet.
On October 29, 2018, it was announced that Gray Gaulding will drive for SS-Green Light Racing full-time in the No. 08 car.
On October 31, 2018, it was announced that 2018 NASCAR Xfinity Series Champion Tyler Reddick will move from JR Motorsports to Richard Childress Racing in the 2019 season. During RCR's 50th anniversary press conference on December 14, 2018, it was announced that Reddick will be the organization's only full-time Xfinity Series driver in 2019.
On October 31, 2018, Dale Earnhardt Jr. tweeted, saying that he is working towards running the Darlington race in the 2019 NASCAR Xfinity Series. He had also tweeted a partial photo of a car a few weeks prior. *On February 1, 2019, Earnhardt Jr. confirmed that he will race at the Sport Clips Haircuts VFW 200 at Darlington Raceway on August 31.
On November 8, 2018, it was announced that Austin Cindric would drive the No. 22 Team Penske Ford for the entire 2019 season. The No. 12 Team Penske Ford will run on a part-time basis with Monster Energy NASCAR Cup Series drivers Brad Keselowski, Joey Logano, Ryan Blaney, and Paul Menard.
On November 9, 2018, it was announced that Ross Chastain would join Chip Ganassi Racing to drive the No. 42 Chevrolet full-time in 2019. However, following an FBI raid on DC Solar's headquarters in December 2018, it was announced on January 4, 2019, that Chip Ganassi Racing would withdraw from the Xfinity series before the start of the 2019 season. Chastain solidified his plans on January 31, 2019, when he joined Kaulig Racing for three races in the organization's No. 10 car and went back to his old ride at JD Motorsports for the other 30 races on the schedule. However, beginning with the race at Michigan International Speedway in June, Chastain would no longer be earning points towards the championship, as he declared over the week  to shift to running for the NASCAR Gander Outdoors Truck Series title instead.
On November 10, 2018, it was announced that Jeffrey Earnhardt would join Joe Gibbs Racing to drive the No. 18 Toyota Supra for nine races in 2019, including the season opener at Daytona. On February 14, 2019, XCI Racing announced that Earnhardt will drive the No. 81 Toyota for four races in 2019. On August 7, Earnhardt announced that he parted ways with sponsor and XCI affiliate iK9, as well as JGR, after five of the planned nine races. On August 12, 2019, Erik Jones was announced to drive the No. 81 at the Bristol night race.
On November 25, 2018, Morgan Shepherd announced that he will be back in 2019.
On November 29, 2018, it was announced that Chase Briscoe would join Stewart-Haas Racing with Biagi-DenBeste to drive the No. 98 Ford full-time in 2019, while also competing for Rookie of the Year honors. In 2018, Briscoe drove a part-time schedule in the Xfinity Series, splitting time between the No. 98 and the No. 60 Roush Fenway Racing Ford. With Briscoe taking over the 98 it marked the first time since 1998 that Kevin Harvick did not start a Xfinity Series race.
On December 1, 2018, it was announced that Justin Haley would join Kaulig Racing to replace Ryan Truex in the No. 11 Chevrolet. Haley will also compete for Rookie of the Year Honors. Truex has since moved to a part time ride in the No. 8 for JR Motorsports. In 2018, Haley drove the No. 24 GMS Racing Chevrolet Silverado in the NASCAR Camping World Truck Series while also making a few starts in the Xfinity series.
On December 2, 2018, Ty Majeski announced that he will be returning to Super Late Model racing in 2019 after it was revealed that Roush Fenway Racing will shut down its Xfinity program.
On December 4, 2018, it was announced that Blake Koch would make his Xfinity series return by driving the JD Motorsports No. 4 Chevrolet full-time in 2019. On January 31, 2019, Koch announced that he would step away from racing to focus on his business Filter Time. Koch's seat was filled by Ross Chastain for the majority of the schedule.
On December 18, 2018, it was announced that Zane Smith would join JR Motorsports for eight races in the organization's No. 9 car with additional drivers to be announced at a later date. Smith drove in the ARCA Racing Series in 2018, finishing 2nd in final points. On January 25, 2019, it was announced that Smith would share the new No. 8 Chevrolet with Brett Moffitt, Ryan Preece, Ryan Truex, Chase Elliott, Dale Earnhardt Jr., Sheldon Creed and Jeb Burton.
On December 27, 2018, it was announced that Jeff Green and Ryan Sieg will return to RSS Racing full-time in 2019. On June 11, 2019, it was announced that Green will miss the second half of the Xfinity season to undergo rotator cuff surgery. He is expected to return in July as a crew chief for RSS Racing at Iowa.
On January 10, 2019, it was announced that Matt Mills will run the No. 8 for B. J. McLeod Motorsports on a full-time basis. In addition to that announcement, B. J. McLeod, Tommy Joe Martins and Jairo Avila Jr. will share the No. 99 entry that will run full-time in 2019. On February 1, 2019, it was announced that after the No. 8 would be part of JR Motorsports, Mills would be driving the No. 5 car.
On January 16, 2019, MBM Motorsports announced that Joey Gase will run the No. 35 Toyota full-time in the 2019 season.
On February 4, 2019, it was announced that Josh Bilicki would move to RSS Racing in 2019 to drive the organization's No. 38 entry full-time. Bilicki drove full-time in 2018 for JP Motorsports.
On February 28, 2019, it was announced that Elliott Sadler will return to the Xfinity Series part-time, driving the Kaulig Racing No. 10 Chevrolet at Richmond and Las Vegas.
On March 21, 2019, it was announced that A. J. Allmendinger would return to NASCAR competition by driving the No. 10 Kaulig Racing entry at Daytona, Road America, Watkins Glen, Mid Ohio, and Charlotte. Allmendinger is set to make his final start at the Charlotte Roval.
 On June 16, 2019, it was announced that Austin Hill will make his Xfinity Series debut at the July Daytona race in the Hattori Racing Enterprises No. 61 Toyota.
 On July 27, 2019, Mark Meunier drove the Rick Ware Racing/Mike Harmon Racing No. 17 Chevrolet at Iowa, but ultimately failed to qualify for the race.
 On August 6, 2019, JD Motorsports announced that Lawson Aschenbach will drive the No. 4 Chevrolet at Mid-Ohio.
 On August 6, 2019, Brandonbilt Motorsports announced that Will Rodgers will drive the No. 86 Chevrolet at Mid-Ohio and the Charlotte Roval. Rodgers made his debut at the July Iowa race.
 On August 7, 2019, Joe Gibbs Racing announced that Jack Hawksworth will drive the No. 18 Toyota at Mid-Ohio.
 On August 13, 2019, Matt DiBenedetto announced that he will drive the Joe Gibbs Racing No. 18 Toyota at Road America.
On August 15, 2019, Bayley Currey was indefinitely suspended for violating NASCAR's Substance Abuse Policy. He was set to drive the RWR/Harmon No. 17 at the Bristol Night Race. Hours later, reporter Chris Knight tweeted that Kyle Weatherman would be his substitute replacement for that race, although team co-owner Mike Harmon said on Facebook the next day that Joe Nemechek would be subbing in the No. 17 instead. On September 18, Currey was reinstated by NASCAR after he successfully completed his Road to Recovery Program.
On August 19, 2019, it was announced that Dexter Bean will drive the DGM Racing No. 90 Chevrolet at Road America.
On August 28, 2019, RSS Racing announced that Camden Murphy will drive the No. 93 Chevrolet at Darlington.

Crew chiefs
 On October 10, 2018, Hendrick Motorsports announced that Kevin Meendering from the No. 1 JR Motorsports team will replace Chad Knaus as Jimmie Johnson's crew chief in the Monster Energy NASCAR Cup Series (MENCS) in 2019.
 On November 17, 2018, it was announced that two-time defending series champion crew chief Dave Elenz will move to the No. 1 JR Motorsports Chevrolet with rookie Noah Gragson in 2019. On January 7, 2019, it was announced that his replacement for the No. 9 team will be Taylor Moyer. On January 25, 2019, it was announced that Dave Elenz will be the crew chief for the No. 9 Chevrolet with Noah Gragson while Taylor Moyer will be the crew chief for the No. 8 JR Motorsports Chevrolet.
 On December 6, 2018, Joe Gibbs Racing announced that Jeff Meendering will replace Chris Gabehart as crew chief of the No. 19 Toyota, as Gabehart has been promoted to Denny Hamlin's crew chief in the MENCS. Ben Beshore replaces Eric Phillips as crew chief of the No. 18 team, as Phillips moves to the MENCS as the No. 11 car chief.
 On December 14, 2018, Richard Childress Racing announced that Randall Burnett will be Tyler Reddick's crew chief in the No. 2 Chevrolet.
 On June 18, 2019, RSS Racing crew chief Clifford Turner was suspended for violating NASCAR's Substance Abuse Policy. On September 24, NASCAR reinstated Turner after he completed the Road to Recovery Program.
 On July 11, 2019, Team Penske No. 22 crew chief Brian Wilson was suspended for one race after the car scheduled to race at Kentucky was discovered to have an illegal body modification. The L1-level penalty also resulted in a deduction of 10 points for the team and driver Austin Cindric, and a $10,000 fine.
On July 21, 2019, Kaulig Racing announced the passing of Nick Harrison who was crew chief of the No. 11 driven by Justin Haley. Harrison, who passed at age 37, led the No. 11 to a 13th place finish at New Hampshire Motor Speedway the previous day. On July 24, Team President and former No. 11 crew chief Chris Rice was announced as Harrison's interim replacement starting with the Iowa race, although for unknown reasons Alex Yontz is listed on paper as crew chief.

Manufacturers
For the 2019 season, Toyota will replace the Camry with the Supra.
Before the 2018 Homestead race week, MBM Motorsports announced that they were selling their Chevrolet and Dodge Xfinity cars and intends to use Toyota bodies only for the 2019 season. They previously ran cars from all four manufacturers at some point throughout the 2018 season. It is unknown how many cars they will field, although Chad Finchum is expected to stay with the team for 2019.
With the new flange-fit composite bodies being made mandatory in the 2019 season, Dodge left the Xfinity Series after the 2018 season, as the former Team Penske Challengers (nicknamed "Zombie Dodges" due to their lack of factory support since 2013) used by smaller teams were deemed ineligible due to their steel bodies. This also means that Dodge would have no representation in NASCAR's three major series for the first time since 1994.

Rule changes
On August 23, 2018, NASCAR announced that Cup drivers competing in Xfinity Series events would no longer be eligible to earn playoff bonus points for the cars that they were driving.
On the same day, a change in the number of cars in the field was changed, downgrading the field size from 40 cars to 38 cars.
The flange-fit composite bodies, first introduced in 2018, will be made mandatory for all races in the 2019 season.
 On February 4, 2019, NASCAR announced a new post-race inspection rule in all three series, where race-winning teams found to be in violation of the rule book will automatically be disqualified. Following a race, the first-place and second-place teams, along with at least one randomly selected car, will undergo post-race inspection. The inspection should take between 90 minutes and two hours to complete before the race winner is officially declared. The car that fails the inspection will receive last-place points and will be stripped of playoff and stage points.
 At the 2019 Camping World 300 at Chicagoland Speedway on June 29, 2019, Christopher Bell became the first NXS driver to be disqualified under this rule after his car was discovered to be too low on the front during post-race inspection. As a result, his finish was demoted from third place to 38th place. Bell became the first NXS driver to be disqualified since Dale Jarrett in 1995.
 At the 2019 Circle K Firecracker 250 at Daytona International Speedway on July 5, 2019, A. J. Allmendinger became the second NXS driver to be disqualified after his third-place finishing car failed an engine vacuum check during post-race inspection.
 Allmendinger was once again disqualified at the 2019 Zippo 200 at The Glen at Watkins Glen International on August 3, 2019 when his second-place finishing car was discovered to be too low on both rear corners during post-race inspection.
 At the 2019 Sport Clips Haircuts VFW 200 at Darlington Raceway on August 31, 2019, Denny Hamlin was stripped of his win after his car failed to meet height requirements during post-race inspection. As a result, second-place finisher Cole Custer was declared the official race winner.
 At the 2019 Rhino Pro Truck Outfitters 300 at Las Vegas Motor Speedway, Ryan Sieg was disqualified after his 14th-place finishing car failed to meet height requirements during post-race inspection. The violation, however, did not affect Sieg's standing as one of the 12 qualifying drivers for the NXS Playoffs.
 On February 4, 2019, NASCAR announced a change in the qualifying schedule procedures for the majority of its tracks. For short tracks and intermediate speedways, the first round will be shortened from 15 minutes to 10 minutes, while the second and third rounds will remain at 10 and five minutes, respectively. The downtime intervals at all tracks will be reduced from seven minutes to five minutes. Superspeedway qualifications will retain their untimed two-round intervals of single-lap qualifying while road courses will continue to use two qualifying rounds: 25 minutes for the first round and 10 minutes for the final round.
 On May 1, 2019, following continued gamesmanship and other actions causing multi-car qualifying to become "untenable," NASCAR formally returned to single-car qualifying at all oval tracks. Knockout-Style qualifying would be kept at Watkins Glen, Mid-Ohio, Road America, and the Charlotte Motor Speedway Roval.
At oval tracks 1.25 miles and larger, each car will get a single timed lap.
At oval tracks 1.25 miles and smaller, each car will get two timed laps with the faster lap counting as their official time.
The qualifying order draw will be determined in part by the previous race's starting lineup. The top 20 starters from the previous race will draw to take their qualifying lap in positions 21–40 (the second half of qualifying). The remainder of cars will draw to qualify in positions 1–20.
The next car will be sent once the preceding car takes the white flag. This should ensure qualifying is completed in roughly 40 minutes baring any interruptions for crashes, debris, or weather.
There will be two-minute TV breaks built into qualifying to ensure every car gets covered live during the session.
Broadcasters FOX and NBC have committed to using ghost car graphics and impose other technologies to make the session more exciting to TV viewers.
Each car must complete their lap for the session to be counted, otherwise all times will be erased and cars will start by owner points.

Schedule

The schedule, consisting of 33 races, was announced on June 13, 2018. Similar to the Monster Energy Cup Schedule, there are no changes from 2018 to 2019; However, both the regular-season finale at Las Vegas and the playoff race at Texas will be night races.

Bonus money Dash 4 Cash races indicated in BOLD.  Qualifying race for first Dash 4 Cash race in Italics.

Results and standings

Race results

Drivers' Championship

(key) Bold – Pole position awarded by time. Italics – Pole position set by final practice results or owner's points. * – Most laps led. 1 – Stage 1 winner. 2 – Stage 2 winner. 1–10 – Regular season top 10 finishers.
. – Eliminated after Round of 12
. – Eliminated after Round of 8

Owners' championship (Top 15)
(key) Bold - Pole position awarded by time. Italics - Pole position set by final practice results or rainout. * – Most laps led. 1 – Stage 1 winner. 2 – Stage 2 winner. 1-10 – Owners' regular season top 10 finishers. 
. – Eliminated after Round of 12
. – Eliminated after Round of 8

Manufacturers' Championship

See also
2019 Monster Energy NASCAR Cup Series
2019 NASCAR Gander Outdoors Truck Series
2019 ARCA Menards Series
2019 NASCAR K&N Pro Series East
2019 NASCAR K&N Pro Series West
2019 NASCAR Whelen Modified Tour
2019 NASCAR PEAK Mexico Series
2019 NASCAR Whelen Euro Series
2019 NASCAR Pinty's Series

References

NASCAR Xfinity Series seasons
2019 in NASCAR